USS Nourmahal (PG-72) was a gunboat used by the United States Coast Guard and United States Navy during the Second World War.

Construction
The Nourmahal was originally built as a yacht for multi-millionaire Vincent Astor in 1928 at Krupp Iron Works in Kiel, Germany.  This was the third Astor family yacht to bear the name, replacing a smaller Nourmahal designed by Cox & Stevens, Inc. and built by Robert Jacob Shipyard, City Island NY., launched March, 1921. Astor was the heir to a large New York real estate fortune after his father, John Jacob Astor IV, died aboard the RMS Titanic in 1912.

Second World War
With the outbreak of the Second World War, Nourmahal was acquired by the Coast Guard on 21 March 1940 and was commissioned USCGC Nourmahal (WPG-72) on 21 August 1940. Nourmahal was acquired 3 March 1942  by the Navy from Astor under a bareboat charter agreement under which the vessel was to be operated by the Coast Guard under Navy ownership. Nourmahal was designated (PG-72) 9 April 1943 and purchased by the Navy for $1,000,000 under an option of the charter on 25 June 1943 (29 June in DANFS). She was returned to the Coast Guard on 29 December 1943 and reclassified as WPG-122 and was struck from the Naval Register on 12 January 1944.

Post war
Nourmahal was decommissioned on 30 May 1946 and returned to Navy custody in May 1947.

Nourmahal was transferred to the Maritime Administration for disposal on 18 July 1948 and, after several advertisements with no bids accepted the ship remained in the James River Fleet until sold for scrap on 11 September 1964 to Hughes Brothers, Inc. of Hampden, Maine for $27,502. The ship was withdrawn from the fleet on 24 September 1964 for scrapping.

Awards
American Defense Service Medal
American Campaign Medal
World War II Victory Medal

References

Sources
 http://www.navsource.org/archives/12/09072.htm Retrieved: 12 April 2015
U.S. Coast Guard Historian's Office http://www.uscg.mil/history/webcutters/Nourmahal_PG72.pdf Retrieved 12 April 2015

1928 ships
Ships built in Kiel
Motor yachts
Gunboats of the United States Navy
World War II patrol vessels of the United States
Ships transferred from the United States Navy to the United States Coast Guard
Ships of the United States Coast Guard